Novosyolka is a rural locality (a village) in Mstyora Urban Settlement, Vyaznikovsky District, Vladimir Oblast, Russia. The population was 97 as of 2010.

Geography 
Novosyolka is located 23 km northwest of Vyazniki (the district's administrative centre) by road. Zarechny is the nearest rural locality.

References 

Rural localities in Vyaznikovsky District